David Ogilvy (7 June 1859 – 6 August 1917) was an Australian cricketer. He played two first-class matches for New South Wales between 1885/86 and 1886/87.

See also
 List of New South Wales representative cricketers

References

External links
 

1859 births
1917 deaths
Australian cricketers
New South Wales cricketers
Cricketers from Sydney